Justin Wayne is an American politician from the state of Nebraska.

Wayne was elected to the Nebraska Legislature for District 13 in the 2016 Nebraska elections. Previously, he served as president of the board of Omaha Public Schools.

Wayne served as the attorney for the family of James Scurlock, who was shot during the 2020 George Floyd protests in Nebraska.

Early life and education 
Wayne was born on August 27, 1979 in Omaha, Nebraska. He graduated from Omaha Northwest High School in 1998. He earned his B.S. from Creighton University in 2002 and his J.D. from the Creighton University School of Law in 2005.
He has 4 younger siblings.

References

External links

Living people
Politicians from Omaha, Nebraska
School board members in Nebraska
Democratic Party Nebraska state senators
Year of birth missing (living people)
African-American state legislators in Nebraska
21st-century American politicians
Creighton University School of Law alumni
21st-century African-American politicians